First Baptist Church is a historic African-American Baptist church located at Farmville, Prince Edward County, Virginia. It was built between about 1855 an 1895, and is a one-story, rectangular brick Late Gothic Revival style church building on a full basement.  The building features a square tower centered on the primary façade, pointed arch windows with stained- and milk-glass panes, a primary entry with double leaf doors topped by a pointed arch transom and, on the interior, original wood pews and beaded board wainscoting.  The church was the site of a number of meetings related to the desegregation of Prince Edward County schools during the 1950s and 1960s.

It was listed on the National Register of Historic Places in 2013.  It is located in the Farmville Historic District.

See also
Robert Russa Moton Museum
Davis v. County School Board of Prince Edward County
Griffin v. County School Board of Prince Edward County

References

African-American history of Virginia
Baptist churches in Virginia
Churches on the National Register of Historic Places in Virginia
Churches completed in 1895
19th-century Baptist churches in the United States
Gothic Revival church buildings in Virginia
Churches in Prince Edward County, Virginia
National Register of Historic Places in Prince Edward County, Virginia
Individually listed contributing properties to historic districts on the National Register in Virginia